Rodrigo de la Fuente Morgado (born 26 November 1976) is a retired Spanish professional basketball player and the current general manager of the basketball section of FC Barcelona.

Professional career
A 6 ft  in (2.00 m) 220 lb (100 kg) small forward from Madrid, De la Fuente is a graduate of Washington State University.  He won the Triple Crown in 2003 with  FC Barcelona.

In 2007, after playing his entire professional career to date with FC Barcelona, De la Fuente, decided to leave the team and not renew his contract. After starting the 2010–11 season with Estudiantes Madrid, De la Fuente signed with Italian Teramo Basket in December 2010. He was the Captain of Barcelona in his latter days with the team.

In 2011, De la Fuente comes back to Asefa Estudiantes.

Rodrigo retired on June 13, 2013.

After retirement
On 30 June 2016, De la Fuente signed as new general manager of FC Barcelona, replacing Joan Creus.

Notes

External links
Rodrigo De la Fuente on ACB.com

1976 births
Living people
Baloncesto Fuenlabrada players
Basketball players at the 2000 Summer Olympics
Basketball players at the 2004 Summer Olympics
CB Estudiantes players
FC Barcelona Bàsquet players
Liga ACB players
Olympic basketball players of Spain
Pallacanestro Treviso players
Pallacanestro Virtus Roma players
San Jacinto Central Ravens men's basketball players
Small forwards
Spanish men's basketball players
Spanish expatriate basketball people in the United States
Basketball players from Madrid
Washington State Cougars men's basketball players
1998 FIBA World Championship players